The 1970 Holy Cross Crusaders football team was an American football team that represented the College of the Holy Cross as an independent during the 1970 NCAA University Division football season. Bill Whitton returned for a second year as head coach. The team compiled a record of 0–10–1.

Reeling financially from the cancellation of all 1969 home games, Holy Cross opted to schedule an 11-game season for the first time in its history, adding a visit to West Point. The no-win, 10-loss season was the worst result in Holy Cross history to that point.

All home games were played at Fitton Field on the Holy Cross campus in Worcester, Massachusetts.

Schedule

Statistical leaders
Statistical leaders for the 1970 Crusaders included: 
 Rushing: Joe Wilson, 492 yards and 6 touchdowns on 102 attempts
 Passing: Jerry Lamb, 855 yards, 78 completions and 3 touchdowns on 204 attempts
 Receiving: Jack VonOhlen, 358 yards and 3 touchdowns on 30 receptions
 Scoring: Joe Wilson, 44 points from 7 touchdowns and 1 two-point conversion
 Total offense: Colin Clapton, 599 yards (604 passing, minus-5 rushing)
 All-purpose yards: Joe Wilson, 590 yards (492 rushing, 98 receiving)
 Interceptions: Mike Jordan, 4 interceptions for no yards

References

Holy Cross
Holy Cross Crusaders football seasons
College football winless seasons
Holy Cross Crusaders football